Kingsley High School (KHS) is a public high school in Kingsley, Michigan. KHS is the sole high school in the Kingsley Area School District, which serves southern Grand Traverse County. As of 2021, the current principal is Mike Moran. The current building was built in 2001.

Demographics 
The demographic breakdown of the 500 students enrolled in 2021-22 was:

 Male - 51%
 Female - 49%
 Native American/Alaskan - 0.6%
 Asian - 0.8%
 Black - 1.4%
 Hispanic - 2.6%
 Native Hawaiian/Pacific Islander - 0.2%
 White - 93%
 Multiracial - 1.4%
Additionally, 211 students (42.2%) were eligible for reduced-price or free lunch.

Athletics 
KHS offers a number of athletic options for students. It competes in the Northwest Conference, and is classified as a Class B school by the Michigan High School Athletic Association. Kingsley has a number of regional rivalries, however its most intense rivalry is with the Glen Lake Community School Lakers of Maple City in nearby Leelanau County. Kingsley offers the following sports:
Baseball (boys)
Basketball (girls & boys)
Bowling (girls & boys)
Competitive cheer (girls)
Cross country (girls & boys)
Football (boys)
Golf (boys)
Ice hockey (boys)
Soccer (girls & boys)
Softball (girls)
Track (girls & boys)
Volleyball (girls)
Wrestling (boys)

See also 

 Cadillac Area Public Schools
 Traverse City Area Public Schools
 St. Francis High School (Traverse City, Michigan)

References

External links 

 Kingsley Area Schools Homepage

Public high schools in Michigan
Schools in Grand Traverse County, Michigan
School buildings completed in 2001
2001 establishments in Michigan